Salvador "Bingbong" Campo Medialdea (born October 14, 1951) is a Filipino lawyer, business executive and government administrator who served as the Executive Secretary of the Philippines, succeeding Paquito Ochoa Jr. at the start of President Rodrigo Duterte's term on June 30, 2016.

Early life and education
Medialdea is the son of former Supreme Court Associate Justice Leo D. Medialdea who served from 1988 to 1992 under President Corazon Aquino. Born in Manila, Medialdea spent his early years in Davao City, where he was a childhood friend of President Rodrigo Duterte. He attended the Light Bringer School in the city before moving back to Manila to finish high school at Paco Catholic School. He received his BS Commerce Major in Management from Colegio de San Juan de Letran in 1972 and his law degree from San Beda College of Law in 1976. He passed the bar exams the following year.

Career

Medialdea began his legal career as a senior associate at ACCRA Law Offices. He then worked as a partner at Pecabar Law Offices, the law firm of Senators Juan Ponce Enrile and Rene Cayetano, before becoming a managing partner at Medialdea Ata Bello Guevarra Suarez Law Firm (MABGS).

From 1998 to 2000, he served as chairman of the Northern Foods Corporation based in Sarrat. He began work in government in 1998 at the Livelihood Corporation (now National Livelihood Development Corporation) upon the invitation of President Joseph Estrada. He became a member of the board of trustees and administrator of the government-owned corporation while also serving as chairman of the Guarantee Fund for Small and Medium Enterprises. In 2000, he was appointed by Estrada as presidential assistant for political affairs.

Medialdea still serves as partner at the MABGS law firm, whose clients include President Duterte. He is also director for Manchester International Holdings and Accette Insurance. He also served briefly as bar examiner for the Supreme Court in 2006.

On May 8, 2018, President Duterte created the National Quincentennial Committee for the 500th anniversary commemoration of the arrival of the Magellan-Elcano expedition in the Philippine islands, appointing Medialdea as chairman of the committee. They held their inaugural meeting on June 29, 2018, in Baler, Aurora.

Personal life
Medialdea is married to Maria Bertola "Betty" Dizon, a lawyer and head of an insurance company, with whom he has one son. His family has roots in Davao City, Aklan and Ilocos. Outside of work, he enjoys playing piano and classical music. He was one of the producers of Miss Saigon in Manila in 2000 and formally closed the 2019 Southeast Asian Games.

References

1951 births
Assistants to the President of the Philippines
Colegio de San Juan de Letran alumni
Duterte administration cabinet members
Estrada administration personnel
Executive Secretaries of the Philippines
20th-century Filipino lawyers
Filipino business executives
Heads of government-owned and controlled corporations of the Philippines
Living people
People from Davao City
People from Makati
People from Manila
Politicians from Metro Manila
San Beda University alumni
21st-century Filipino lawyers